The South Africa women's national volleyball team represents South Africa in international women's volleyball competitions and friendly matches.

Its best result was 4th place at the 2001 African Women's Volleyball Championship in Nigeria.

Its last qualification to the official African Women's Volleyball Championship dates back to 2007 when the team finished 8th.

African Championship

 Champions   Runners up   Third place   Fourth place

African Games

 Champions   Runners up   Third place   Fourth place

References
South Africa Volleyball Federation

National women's volleyball teams
Volleyball
Volleyball in South Africa